Mariano del Friuli is a town and comune in the province of Gorizia, part of Friuli-Venezia Giulia region of north-eastern Italy. It is the birthplace of the former Italy national football team goalie Dino Zoff.